Rainey House may refer to:

in the United States (by state)
Rainey's Cabin, College, Alaska, listed on the NRHP in Fairbanks North Star Borough, Alaska
Matthew Rainey House, El Dorado, Arkansas, listed on the NRHP in Union County, Arkansas
Gertrude Ma Pridgett Rainey House, Columbus, Georgia, listed on the NRHP in Muscogee County, Georgia 
Henry T. Rainey Farm, Carrollton, Illinois, listed on the NRHP in Greene County, Illinois
Joseph H. Rainey House, Georgetown, South Carolina, listed on the NRHP in Georgetown County, South Carolina
Rainey House (Franklin, Tennessee), listed on the National Register of Historic Places in Williamson County, Tennessee

See also
Raney House (disambiguation)